Onar (also Romanized as Unar) is a village in Lahrud Rural District of Meshgin-e Sharqi District, Meshgin Shahr County, Ardabil province, Iran. At the 2006 census, its population was 1,786 in 465 households. The following census in 2011 counted 1,127 people in 342 households. The latest census in 2016 showed a population of 1,488 people in 516 households; it was the largest village in its rural district.

References 

Meshgin Shahr County

Towns and villages in Meshgin Shahr County

Populated places in Ardabil Province

Populated places in Meshgin Shahr County